Abd-al-Masih (or Abda) was a Jewish Christian martyr and saint of Late Antiquity. The name Abd-Al-Masih means  "servant of the Messiah" in Arabic and is a posthumous title, not his name.

Abd al-Masih, born Asher ben Levi was a converted Jewish shepherd boy in Sassanian Mesopotamia who was killed by his father Levi for his faith. Having been converted to Christianity he pierced his ear to wear an earring (probably indication of his slavery). He died in 390 AD. The story is set in Singara and is a Syriac text with later versions in Arabic and Armenian. There is disagreement about the location of his martyrdom. Some sources say Singar (in modern Iraq near the Syrian border), and others say Taglibis in Arabia. He is regarded as the patron saint of sterile women in Syria, and has his feast day observed on July 13, and July 22 or October 3.

References

Sources

External links
Eastern Christianity
A New Dictionary of Saints

People from Sinjar
4th-century Christian martyrs
Converts to Christianity from Judaism
Christian saints
Year of birth missing
Iraqi Jews
390 deaths